Thurgood Marshall High School was a public high school located in Baltimore, Maryland. The school is named for Baltimore native Thurgood Marshall, the first African American to be appointed as a Justice of the U.S. Supreme Court.

Public schools in Baltimore
Public high schools in Maryland
Defunct schools in Maryland